Mukono Health Centre IV (MHC4), commonly known as Mukono Mini Hospital is an outpatient health facility in Mukono Town in Uganda.

Location
The coordinates of the clinic are: 0°21'40.0"N, 32°44'49.0"E (Latitude:0.361123; Longitude:32.746941).

Overview
MHC4 is owned and operated by the Government of Uganda, through the Uganda Ministry of Health. The facility faces challenges with infrastructure, staffing and medication. Some of the operational funding is met by outside donors. There are plans to upgrade the facility to full hospital status.

See also
List of hospitals in Uganda
Uganda Ministry of Health

References

External links
Safe Male Circumcision Offered At Mukono Health Center

Hospital buildings completed in 2006
Hospitals in Uganda
Mukono District